Hitov Spur (‘Hitov Rid’ \'hi-tov 'rid\) is the narrow, rocky ridge descending from elevation 1700 to 500 m, and projecting from Forbidden Plateau 6.3 km east-southeastwards into Hektoria Glacier on Oscar II Coast in Graham Land. The feature is named after Panayot Hitov (1830-1918), a leader of the Bulgarian liberation movement, in connection with the settlement of Panayot Hitovo in Northeastern Bulgaria.

Location
British mapping in 1978.

Maps
 British Antarctic Territory.  Scale 1:200000 topographic map.  DOS 610 Series, Sheet W 64 60.  Directorate of Overseas Surveys, Tolworth, UK, 1978.
 Antarctic Digital Database (ADD). Scale 1:250000 topographic map of Antarctica. Scientific Committee on Antarctic Research (SCAR). Since 1993, regularly upgraded and updated.

Notes

References
 Hitov Spur. SCAR Composite Antarctic Gazetteer.
 Bulgarian Antarctic Gazetteer. Antarctic Place-names Commission. (details in Bulgarian, basic data in English)

External links
 Hitov Spur. Adjusted Copernix satellite image

Ridges of Graham Land
Oscar II Coast
Bulgaria and the Antarctic